The 1990 US Open was a tennis tournament played on outdoor hard courts at the USTA National Tennis Center in New York City in the United States. It was the 110th edition of the US Open and was held from August 27 to September 9, 1990.

Seniors

Men's singles

 Pete Sampras defeated  Andre Agassi 6–4, 6–3, 6–2
 It was Pete Sampras' 1st career Grand Slam title and his 1st US Open title. He became the youngest US Open men's singles champion at 19 years, 28 days.

Women's singles

 Gabriela Sabatini defeated  Steffi Graf 6–2, 7–6(7–4)
 It was Sabatini's only Grand Slam title. She became the first female tennis player from Argentina to win a Grand Slam singles title.

Men's doubles

 Pieter Aldrich /  Danie Visser defeated  Paul Annacone /  David Wheaton 6–2, 7–6 (7–3), 6–2
 It was Pieter Aldrich's 2nd and last career Grand Slam title and his only US Open title. It was Danie Visser's 2nd career Grand Slam title and his only US Open title.

Women's doubles

 Gigi Fernández /  Martina Navratilova defeated  Jana Novotná /  Helena Suková 6–2, 6–4
 It was Gigi Fernández's 2nd career Grand Slam title and her 2nd US Open title. It was Martina Navratilova's 55th career Grand Slam title and her 15th US Open title.

Mixed doubles

 Elizabeth Smylie /  Todd Woodbridge defeated  Natasha Zvereva /  Jim Pugh 6–4, 6–2
 It was Elizabeth Smylie's 3rd career Grand Slam title and her 2nd and last US Open title. It was Todd Woodbridge's 1st career Grand Slam title and his 1st US Open title.

Juniors

Boys' singles

 Andrea Gaudenzi defeated  Mikael Tillström 6–2, 4–6, 7–6

Girls' singles

 Magdalena Maleeva defeated  Noëlle van Lottum 7–5, 6–2

Boys' doubles

 Sébastien Leblanc /  Greg Rusedski defeated  Marten Renström /  Mikael Tillström 6–7, 6–3, 6–4

Girls' doubles

 Kristin Godridge /  Kirrily Sharpe defeated  Erika deLone /  Lisa Raymond 4–6, 7–5, 6–2

Other events

Gentlemen's invitation singles

 Sandy Mayer defeated  Tom Gullikson 6–4, 6–4

Gentlemen's invitation doubles

 Tom Gullikson /  Dick Stockton defeated  Mark Edmondson /  Sherwood Stewart 6–7, 7–6, 6–4

Ladies' invitation doubles

 Rosemary Casals /  Billie Jean King defeated  Wendy Turnbull /  Virginia Wade 2–6, 6–4, 6–3

Prize money

Total prize money for the event was $6,349,250.

References

External links
 Official US Open website

 
 

 
US Open
US Open (tennis) by year
US Open
US Open
US Open
US Open